Robert Lawrence FitzPatrick is an author. He serves as president of Pyramid Scheme Alert, a consumer organization to confront the abuses of pyramid schemes.

Biography

Early career

Fitzpatrick's interest in pyramid schemes was sparked in the 1980s when he joined a business with a multi-level, direct-sales model. While Fitzpatrick didn't lose money, he did witness first-hand how one could get sucked into what he called "delusional behavior".

Author
FitzPatrick is the co-author of the self-published book False Profits: Seeking Financial and Spiritual Deliverance in Multi-Level Marketing and Pyramid Schemes, a 1997 critical book that examines the multi-level marketing industry. He has followed it up with his book Ponzinomics: The Untold Story of Multi-Level Marketing.

Speaker
FitzPatrick has been featured on Fraud Squad TV, ABC World News and WTTW's Chicago Matters. He has been interviewed live on CBC's Marketplace. He has been quoted in newspapers and journals, including The Wall Street Journal and The New York Times.

References

External links 
 
 Robert L. FitzPatrick Official False Profits Blog
 Pyramid Scheme Alert - Homepage
 Robert L. FitzPatrick Interview on Charlotte Talks Radio Show (12-4-2006)
 Robert L. FitzPatrick Interview - ZenBiz Radio
 Robert L. FitzPatrick - Speech at the annual meeting of the Association of Certified Fraud Specialists in San Francisco (September, 2006)

Living people
Year of birth missing (living people)
American non-fiction writers
Writers from Charlotte, North Carolina
People associated with direct selling